Hubbard's Hill is a  geological Site of Special Scientific Interest south of Sevenoaks in Kent. It is a Geological Conservation Review site.

This Quaternary site exhibits solifluction (erosion by freezing and thawing). The main deposits date to the Wolstonian glaciation around 130,000 years ago, but the latest have radiocarbon dates of only 12,500 years, during the most recent Younger Dryas ice age.

The Greensand Way long distance footpath goes through the site.

References

Sites of Special Scientific Interest in Kent
Geological Conservation Review sites
Hills of Kent